Wolfram Bialas (25 August 1935 — 2 January 1998) was a German chess FIDE master and Chess Olympiad team bronze medal winner (1964).

Biography
Wolfram Bialas twice won the West Berlin City Chess Championship (1958, 1962). He played for chess clubs that won the Chess Bundesliga three times: in 1957 for Berliner Schachgesellschaft Eckbauer, in 1961 for Berliner SG 1827 Eckbauer and in 1978 for Königsspringer Frankfurt.

Wolfram Bialas played for West Germany in the Chess Olympiads:
 in 1960, at the reserve board in the 14th Chess Olympiad in Leipzig (+2, =5, -4),
 in 1964, at the second reserve board in the 16th Chess Olympiad in Tel Aviv (+1, =7, -1), winning a team bronze medal.

Wolfram Bialas played for West Germany in the European Team Chess Championship preliminaries:
 in 1957, at the seventh board in the 1st European Team Chess Championship preliminaries (+2, =2, -0),
 in 1961, at the eighth board in the 2nd European Team Chess Championship preliminaries (+2, =1, -0),
 in 1965, at the third board in the 3rd European Team Chess Championship preliminaries (+2, =1, -1).

Wolfram Bialas played for West Germany in the Clare Benedict Chess Cups:
 in 1960, at the reserve board in the 7th Clare Benedict Chess Cup in Biel (+0, =1, -2), winning a team silver medal,
 in 1961, at the fourth board in the 8th Clare Benedict Chess Cup in Neuhausen (+1, =1, -2), winning team and individual gold medals.

References

External links
 
 
 
 

1935 births
1998 deaths
German chess players
Chess FIDE Masters
Chess Olympiad competitors
20th-century chess players